Malygin (Малыгин) may refer to one of the following icebreakers:

 , built in 1912 as the British merchant ship Bruce, and later a Russian, then Soviet, icebreaker; lost in 1940.
 , formerly the Finnish icebreaker Voima, built 1924, that was handed over to the Soviet Union as war reparations in 1945 and broken up in 1971.

Ship names